Whiteside Godfrey Hunter (December 25, 1841 – November 2, 1917) was a U.S. Representative from Kentucky.

Early life
Born near Belfast, Ireland, Hunter completed preparatory studies. He immigrated to the United States in 1858 and settled in New Castle, Pennsylvania. He studied medicine in Philadelphia and was admitted to practice.

Career
Hunter was a surgeon in the Union Army during the Civil War. He moved to Burkesville, Kentucky, at the close of the war. He served as member of the Kentucky House of Representatives from 1874 to 1878. He served as delegate to the 1880 and 1892 Republican National Conventions. He served as the United States Minister to Guatemala and Honduras from November 8, 1897, to December 8, 1902.

Hunter was elected as a Republican to the Fiftieth Congress (March 4, 1887 – March 3, 1889). He was an unsuccessful candidate for reelection in 1888 to the Fifty-first Congress and for election in 1892 to the Fifty-third Congress.

Hunter was elected to the Fifty-fourth Congress (March 4, 1895 – March 3, 1897).
He was an unsuccessful candidate for reelection in 1896 to the Fifty-fifth Congress.

Hunter was elected to the Fifty-eighth Congress to fill the vacancy caused by the death of Vincent S. Boreing and served from November 10, 1903, to March 3, 1905. He was not a candidate for renomination in 1904. He was interested in public utilities and the development of oil lands.

Personal life
Hunter resided in Louisville, Kentucky, until his death there on November 2, 1917. He was interred in Cave Hill Cemetery in Louisville.

References

 
 
 

|-

1841 births
1917 deaths
Ambassadors of the United States to Guatemala
Ambassadors of the United States to Honduras
Republican Party members of the United States House of Representatives from Kentucky
Irish emigrants to the United States (before 1923)
People from New Castle, Pennsylvania
People from Burkesville, Kentucky
Politicians from Louisville, Kentucky
19th-century American politicians
Union Army surgeons
Military personnel from Pennsylvania
Burials at Cave Hill Cemetery